In the first edition of the tournament, John Fitzgerald and Anders Järryd won the title by defeating Grant Connell and Patrick Galbraith 6–2, 6–1 in the final.

Seeds

Draw

Draw

References

External links
 Official results archive (ATP)
 Official results archive (ITF)

1993 ATP Tour
1993 Dubai Tennis Championships